Försvarsmakten is a Swedish word meaning "The Defence Force". It is:

 The official name in Swedish of the Swedish Armed Forces
 The official name in Swedish of the Finnish Defence Forces